WMAN (1400 kHz) is an AM radio station  broadcasting a News Talk Information format. Licensed to Mansfield, Ohio, United States, the station serves the Mid-Ohio area.  The station is currently owned by iHeartMedia, Inc. and features programming from Fox News Radio, Compass Media Networks, and Premiere Networks.

The station was first licensed December 29, 1939. Since December 26, 2011, WMAN simulcasts on WMAN-FM (98.3 FM), with WMAN-FM now taking top priority in station branding.

References

External links

MAN
News and talk radio stations in the United States
Radio stations established in 1939
1939 establishments in Ohio
IHeartMedia radio stations